Michael Hodges is an American speculative fiction writer. His debut novel, The Puller, was released on April 24, 2015. The film rights for The Puller were purchased by Sonny Mallhi, producer of The Strangers and The Lake House. The Puller also received a five star review from SF Signal. Foreign publishing rights were purchased by Luzifer Verlag, and The Puller was translated and released in Germany. His follow-up novel was The Invasive, a science fiction novel about alien ecosystem replacement in Montana. The Invasive is an Amazon best-seller, and audio rights were purchased by Tantor Media, with an AudioBook release date of February 28, 2017. Michael's short stories have been published in over twenty magazines and anthologies. In March, 2021, reprint rights for The Puller were sold to Pyr, with distribution by Simon and Schuster. The Puller was developed as an audiobook by Tantor Media, with a release date of February 28th, 2022.

Hodges' is represented by Lane Heymont of Tobias Literary Agency. Film agent Susan Schulman (The English Patient) handled film rights. He's also a member of HWA, and SFWA.

He also taught a writing panel with Game of Thrones editor Anne Groell ("How to Improve Your Novel's Ending", Missoula Con, 2015).

Along with writing fiction, Hodges is a professional photographer, with work appearing in Outside Magazine (Best Adventure Photography of the Year) and newspapers, amongst other places. Animals and nature often play a big role in his fiction, and the two art forms feed each other. His latest novel is Black Friday.

Bibliography

Novels

 The Puller, Pyr, November 16th, 2021
 The Puller, Severed Press, 2015, optioned for film. 
 The Invasive, Severed Press, July 8, 2016, Amazon Best Seller.
 Black Friday, Severed Press, February 10, 2017. 
 The Last Colossus , Severed Press, June 3, 2017. ) 
 The Gloaming - 16 Organic Tales, Dark Gravity, February 6, 2017.

Audiobooks

 The Puller, Tantor Audio, February 28th, 2022. iTunes, Audible.
 The Invasive, Tantor Audio 2017. iTunes, etc.
 The Last Colossus, Beacon, 2017. iTunes, etc.

Short stories

 "Glass Eye Pines" - "Perihelion Science Fiction" November 2015 
 "Geiter" – Perihelion Science Fiction – January 2014
 "Divinity" – Perihelion Science Fiction – May 2014
 "Lost Planes, Lost River" – Perihelion Science Fiction – January 2014
 "9 Steps from Door 9" – Spark: A Creative Anthology, Vol. IV – January 2014
 "Hydra" – AE: The Canadian Science Fiction Review – November 2013
 "Swampy Transitions" – Plasma Frequency – December 2013
 "Carillion’s Schemes" – Perihelion Science Fiction – October 2013
 "Fletcher’s Mountains" – Perihelion Science Fiction – June, 2013
 "Lost Branch of the Silver" – Bards and Sages Quarterly – October 2013
 "Uncommon Ally" – Penumbra – May 2013
 "Krieger" – Interstellar Fiction – April 2013
 "Seven Fish for Sarah" – Penumbra – December 2012.
 "Storm Fronts" – The Old, Weird South (anthology) – December 2012.
 "From the Mountain, Fury" – Bards and Sages Quarterly – January 2013.
 "Grangy" – AE: The Canadian Science Fiction Review – October 2012
 "Frequencies" – Plasma Frequency – August 2012.
 "Street Lamps and Carbaryl" – Bards and Sages Quarterly – April 2012.
 "Big, Blue Steel" – Sparks: Standout Fantasy (anthology) – February 2012.
 "Window of Jacob" – Big Book of New Short Horror – September 2011.
 "The Believers" – America the Horrific (anthology) – 2011.
 "The Watcher in the Corner" – Something Wicked – October 2011.
 "The Red Aspen" – Ghostlight – September 2011.
 "Shiners" – Dead Bait 2 (anthology), with Ramsey Campbell, James Robert Smith, and Steve Alten – 2011
 Link to complete bibliography.

References

External links
 Official website
 Missoulian coverage
 SF Signal review 
 Missoula Independent review 
 Chicago Tribune 
 The Tobias Literary Agency
 FinePrint Literary
 Verified Facebook Page
 Instagram
 Photography and non-fiction page
 Twitter
 Chicago Tribune "The Invasive" coverage
 Outside Magazine Adventure Photography of the Year
 Locus Magazine Puller announcement 2021
 iTunes edition of The Invasive
 Official Simon and Schuster author page
 Washington Post front page story on Montana extreme weather
 The Puller audio book on Apple

Living people
American male writers
People from Winfield, Illinois
1976 births